Enzo Hernán Díaz (born 7 December 1995) is an Argentine professional footballer who plays as a left-back for River Plate.

Career
Díaz's career began with Agropecuario. He appeared in the club's first-team squad during the 2015 and 2016 Torneo Federal B seasons, scoring two goals in thirty-nine appearances for the club. They won back-to-back promotions over the next two campaigns, going from Torneo Federal B to Primera B Nacional. He subsequently made his professional debut on 24 September 2017 during a win away to Flandria, in a season that saw Díaz scouted by Manchester United. Midway through 2018–19, on 14 January 2019, Talleres of the Primera División loaned Díaz. Talleres decided to buy him free at the end of the year.

Career statistics
.

Honours
Agropecuario
 Torneo Federal A: 2016–17

References

External links

1995 births
Living people
Sportspeople from Córdoba Province, Argentina
Argentine footballers
Association football midfielders
Torneo Federal A players
Primera Nacional players
Club Agropecuario Argentino players
Talleres de Córdoba footballers